Pitcairn is a surname of Scottish origin. Notable people with the surname include:

 Alexander Pitcairn (1750–1814), English cricketer
 David Pitcairn (1749–1809), Scottish physician, son of John Pitcairn and brother of the midshipman Robert Pitcairn
 Elizabeth Pitcairn (born 1973), American violinist
 Feodor Pitcairn (1934–2021), American photographer, cinematographer, naturalist and environmentalist, grandson of John Pitcairn and uncle of Elizabeth Pitcairn
 Harold Frederick Pitcairn (1897–1960), American aviation inventor and pioneer
 Hugh Pitcairn (1845–1911), first United States consul general to Hamburg, German Empire, brother of railroad executive Robert Pitcairn and John Pitcairn Jr.
 James Pitcairn (1776–1859), British physician and Director-General of the Medical Department for Ireland
 John Pitcairn (1722–1775), British marine officer during the American Revolutionary War
 John Pitcairn Jr. (1841–1916), Scottish-born American industrialist and philanthropist
 Joseph Pitcairn (1764–1844) was an American diplomat, landowner and the American consul to the free Hansa city of Hamburg
 Raymond Pitcairn ((1885–1966), American lawyer, businessman and politician, son of John Pitcairn Jr.
 Robert Pitcairn (1836–1909), Scottish-American railroad executive
 Robert Pitcairn (antiquary) (1793–1855), British antiquary
 Robert Pitcairn (athlete) (1938–2022), Canadian sport shooter
 Robert Pitcairn (commendator) (1520?–1584), Scottish diplomat and judge
 Robert Pitcairn (Royal Navy officer) (1752–c. 1770), Royal Navy midshipman, first European to sight Pitcairn Island, son of marine officer John Pitcairn
 Theodore Pitcairn (1893–1973), American clergyman, theologian, philanthropist and connoisseur of the arts and antiquities, son of the industrialist John Pitcairn
 Thomas Pitcairn (1800–1854), Scottish Presbyterian minister 
 William Pitcairn (1712–1791), Scottish physician and botanist, brother of marine officer John Pitcairn
 William Fettes Pitcairn (1804–1891), Scottish theological author

References

Surnames of Scottish origin